Bilha is a city and a nagar panchayat in Bilaspur district  in the state of Chhattisgarh, India.

Demographics
The Biggest block in India,  India census Bilha had a population of 8992 of which males constitute 51% and females 49%. The average literacy rate is 58%, which is lower than the national average of 59.5%—male literacy is 68% and female 49%. 17% of the population is under six years of age.

Bilha the biggest Block of India and Mr Radhe Shyam Nayak is the CEO of Bilha Janpad Panchayat since May 2016.

References

Cities and towns in Bilaspur district, Chhattisgarh